Alexandr Stolnikov (born ) is a Kazakhstani male volleyball player. He is part of the Kazakhstan men's national volleyball team. On club level he plays for Tnk Kazchrome. Aleksandr Stolnikov was born on 17 July 1988 in Almaty, Kazakhstan. He started playing volleyball like his parents. Professional career began in 2000. His first professional volleyball club was «Condensat» (Uralsk). Alexander's national team debut took place at the qualifying round for the World Cup in Chinese Taipei. The club he plays at now – is « TNK-Kazkhrom».

References

External links
 profile at FIVB.org

1988 births
Living people
Kazakhstani men's volleyball players
Place of birth missing (living people)
Volleyball players at the 2010 Asian Games
Volleyball players at the 2014 Asian Games
Asian Games competitors for Kazakhstan